Wilson Miranda Lima (born 26 June 1976) is a Brazilian politician, journalist and the Governor of the state of Amazonas. Lima won the 2018 election with 58% of the vote, defeating PDT incumbent Amazonino Mendes. A member of PSC, Lima assumed office on 1 January 2019.

References

1976 births
Living people
Governors of Amazonas (Brazilian state)
People from Pará
Social Christian Party (Brazil) politicians